Michelle Miller is a national correspondent for CBS News and currently serves as a co-host on CBS Saturday Morning. She has also served as a substitute anchor on CBS Mornings and 48 Hours on ID.

Early life
Miller was born in Los Angeles, California.  She earned a Bachelor of Arts degree in journalism from Howard University and holds a Master of Science degree in urban studies from the University of New Orleans.

Career

Upon first arriving  in New York City, Miller served as National Correspondent and substitute anchor for BET Nightly News.

In 1988, Miller served as an intern at Nightline and the Minneapolis Star Tribune.  From 1989 to 1990, she wrote for the South Bay and Valley editions of the Los Angeles Times.  From 1990 to 1993, she worked as an Assignment Editor, Producer and Reporter for Orange County Newschannel in Santa Ana, California.  From 1993 to 1994, she was a reporter and Weekend Morning anchor at WIS-TV in Columbia, South Carolina.

From 1994 to 2003, Miller lived in New Orleans and worked as a reporter and anchor for WWL-TV, the CBS affiliate. For three of those years, her broadcast, "The Early Edition" was the highest rated newscast in its time slot across the Nation.  Also between 1998 and 2001, Miller taught communications and broadcast journalism at Dillard University.

In 2003, Miller had a cameo appearance as a reporter in the movie Runaway Jury based on the novel by John Grisham.

In 2004, Miller joined CBS News.

Awards

Miller received an Edward R. Murrow Award in 1998 and the Woman of the Year Award from the National Sports Foundation. She also received the National Association of Black Journalists Award of Excellence in 1997. Miller received an honorary degree from St. Francis College upon reading her keynote address for the school's May commencement ceremony for the Class of 2019.

Author

Miller is the author of a memoir Belonging: A Daughter's Search for Identity Through Love and Loss, published in 2023.

Personal life

Miller is married to Marc Morial, President and CEO of the National Urban League and former New Orleans mayor.  She and her husband have a son, Mason, born in 2002, and a daughter, Margeaux, born in 2005.

Miller's father, Dr. Ross Miller, MD, was the first  physician to attend to Robert F. Kennedy at the site of his assassination on June 5, 1968.

References

External links
 Michelle Miller's biography from the CBS News website.
 Life After Katrina- Michelle Miller is interviewed for the article.

African-American journalists
African-American television personalities
African-American women journalists
American women television journalists
American television reporters and correspondents
Louisiana television anchors
Television anchors from New Orleans
New Orleans television reporters
South Carolina television anchors
Dillard University faculty
Howard University alumni
University of New Orleans alumni
People from Los Angeles
1965 births
Living people
CBS News people
American women academics
21st-century African-American people
21st-century African-American women
20th-century African-American people
20th-century African-American women